Rudaghara is a small village in Dumuria Upazila of Khulna Division, Bangladesh.

References

Populated places in Khulna Division
Villages in Khulna District
Villages in Khulna Division